Daniel Welch (born February 23, 1981) is an American former professional ice hockey player.

Playing career
Welch was selected by the Los Angeles Kings in the 8th round (245th overall) of the 2000 NHL Entry Draft. He joined the team in 2003 but spent his time playing in the American Hockey League for the Manchester Monarchs and in the ECHL for the Reading Royals. The Kings released him in 2005 and he moved to the United Kingdom and signed for the Nottingham Panthers of the Elite Ice Hockey League, but he departed after just seven games and signed for the Coventry Blaze of the same league.

In 2006, Welch moved to France and signed for Pingouins de Morzine-Avoriaz in the Ligue Magnus. In 2007 he had a brief spell in Switzerland's National League B with HC Neuchâtel Young Sprinters, where he played four games, before returning to North America with the ECHL's Texas Wildcatters. In 2008 he had a spell in Denmark with TOTEMPO HvIK before returning once more to the ECHL with the Idaho Steelheads.

He then had brief spells in the Central Hockey League in 2009 with the Colorado Eagles and the Texas Brahmas before returning to the UK with the Edinburgh Capitals. On August 4, 2010, the Belfast Giants announced that they had signed Welch as a free agent.

Career statistics

Regular season and playoffs

International

References

External links

1981 births
Living people
American men's ice hockey forwards
Belfast Giants players
Colorado Eagles players
Coventry Blaze players
Edinburgh Capitals players
HC Morzine-Avoriaz players
Hvidovre Ligahockey players
Idaho Steelheads (ECHL) players
Los Angeles Kings draft picks
Manchester Monarchs (AHL) players
Minnesota Golden Gophers men's ice hockey players
Neuchâtel Young Sprinters HC players
Nottingham Panthers players
Omaha Lancers players
Reading Royals players
Fort Worth Brahmas players
Texas Wildcatters players
Ice hockey players from Minnesota
NCAA men's ice hockey national champions
American expatriate ice hockey players in Northern Ireland
American expatriate ice hockey players in Scotland
American expatriate ice hockey players in England
American expatriate ice hockey players in Denmark
American expatriate ice hockey players in France
American expatriate ice hockey players in Switzerland